The Marche regional election of 1990 took place on 6 and 7 May 1990.

Events
Christian Democracy was the largest party. After the election Christian Democrat Rodolfo Giampaoli formed a new government including also the Italian Socialist Party, the Italian Democratic Socialist Party and the Italian Republican Party (organic Centre-left). Gaetano Recchi took over from Giampaoli in 1993.

Results

Source: Ministry of the Interior

References

Elections in Marche
1990 elections in Italy